Alexander Hugh Hore (24 September 1829 – 7 April 1903) was an English first-class cricketer and clergyman.

The son of James Hore, he was born in September 1829 at Camberwell. He was educated at Tonbridge School, before going up to Trinity College, Oxford. While studying at Oxford, he made a single appearance in first-class cricket for Oxford University against the Cambridge University at Lord's in The University Match of 1851. Batting twice in the match, he was dismissed for 2 runs by Edward Blore in the Oxford first innings, while in the Oxford second innings of 140 all out, he was unbeaten without scoring. In a match which Cambridge won by an innings and 4 runs, Hore took one wicket in the Cambridge innings, that of William Norris.

After graduating from Oxford, Hore took holy orders in the Church of England in 1873. His first ecclesiastical post was as curate of Plympton from 1859–62, before serving as a Chaplain to the Forces from 1861–74. He retired in 1874, after which he resided at Eastbourne and wrote a number of books on the church. Hore later moved to Cheltenham, where he died suddenly in April 1903.

References

External links

1829 births
1903 deaths
People from Camberwell
People educated at Tonbridge School
Alumni of Trinity College, Oxford
English cricketers
Oxford University cricketers
19th-century English Anglican priests
English military chaplains
20th-century English Anglican priests